Indian Chimney Falls is a 60-foot (18.2 m) waterfall in Lansing, New York. It is named after a nearby shale formation formed by a creek. The creek with its waterfall are a hanging valley entering as a tributary to the glaciated main valley of Cayuga Lake.

This waterfall is located on Indian Chimney Farm, an agritourism farm.

Waterfalls of New York (state)
Landforms of Tompkins County, New York